Giorgia is the Italian cognate of the female name Georgia. Notable people with the name include:

Arts and entertainment
Giorgia (singer), Italian singer, born Giorgia Todrani
Giorgia Fumanti, Italian-Canadian soprano and singer of operatic pop
Giorgia Gueglio, Italian singer
Giorgia Moll, Italian actress
Giorgia Palmas, Italian television personality
Giorgia Surina, Italian television personality
Giorgia Whigham, American actress
Giorgia Würth, Swiss-Italian actress

Sports people
Giorgia Apollonio, Italian curler
Giorgia Benecchi, Italian pole vaulter
Giorgia Bronzini, Italian professional racing cyclist
Giorgia Carrossa, Italian figure skater
Giorgia Motta, Italian footballer
Giorgia Villa, Italian artistic gymnast

Other people
Giorgia Meloni, Italian politician

See also
Giorgia (moth), a genus of moths

Italian feminine given names